The Basic Party for Renewal and Democracy was a political party in Suriname.

2005 elections
At the legislative elections (25 May 2005), the party was part of the People's Alliance for Progress that won 14.5% of the popular vote and five out of 51 seats in the National Assembly.  The BVD itself won one seat.

2010 elections
The BVD formed a coalition with the Political Wing of the FAL for the 2010 elections (25 May 2010).  This coalition received 5.07% of the popular vote, but did not enter the National Assembly.

Dissolution
Party members who opposed the merger decided to continue as "The New Lion" (De Nieuwe Leeuw) party, in reference to the logo of the BVD.

Electoral results

Timeline of party chairmen 
 Atta Mungra, 1996-1998  
 Tjan Gobardhan, 1998-2007  
 Dilip Sardjoe, 2007-2014

References

Defunct political parties in Suriname